Grand Bourg is a city in Malvinas Argentinas Partido, Buenos Aires Province, Argentina. It forms part of the Greater Buenos Aires agglomeration.

Toponymy 
Grand Bourg is named after the French commune of Grand-Bourg, where the leader of the Argentine War of Independence, General José de San Martín, lived in exile.

History 
The location belonged to the 19th century estancias of Juan Andrés de Cabo and Pastor Parra. Orchards and dairy farms thus predominated until, in 1948, the first lots were sold by the G.C. Grosso real estate company along the Belgrano North Railway Line. A stop was opened at the site in 1951, followed by a station in 1956. Known initially as Primero de Mayo, the station and town were renamed Grand Bourg in 1959.

The city became a significant manufacturing center in subsequent decades.

The "Cemetery of Grand Bourg" was the site of one of the largest mass graves found in the aftermath of Argentina's Dirty War of the late 1970s; over three hundred cadavers thus buried were located at the cemetery in 1984.

Grand Bourg was declared a city by the Provincial Legislature on November 28, 1985.

References

External links

 Municipal website map

Populated places in Buenos Aires Province
Populated places established in 1948
Malvinas Argentinas Partido
Cities in Argentina